Sandy Iannella (born 6 April 1987) is an Italian footballer who plays as a striker for Sassuolo. She previously played for third-tier Livorno and Serie A club Torres.

Iannella was released by Cuneo after the club sold their Serie A license to Juventus. She was signed by Sassuolo on 7 August.

She was an under-19 international and has represented the senior squad.

Honours
Torres Calcio Femminile
 Serie A 2009–10, 2010–11, 2011–12, 2012–13
 Coppa Italia, 2007–08, 2010–11
 Supercoppa Italiana, 2009, 2010, 2011, 2012, 2013
 Italy Women's Cup, 2008

References

1987 births
Living people
Italian women's footballers
Italy women's international footballers
Torres Calcio Femminile players
Sportspeople from Livorno
Women's association football forwards
U.S. Sassuolo Calcio (women) players
Atalanta Mozzanica Calcio Femminile Dilettantistico players
Footballers from Tuscany
UEFA Women's Euro 2017 players